"Rise up, Ukraine!" (Russian: "Вставай, Украина!") was a nationwide series of political protests by opposition parties All-Ukrainian Union "Fatherland", UDAR and All-Ukrainian Union "Svoboda" against the government of the former Ukrainian President Viktor Yanukovych that commenced on 14 March 2013. It was intended as a two-month campaign to end on 18 May 2013 in Kyiv. But the provisional final date was initially from May 2013 postponed to 24 August 2013, Independence Day of Ukraine. In June 2013 the organisers claimed that no final end of the protest had been set.

Kyiv protest
A campaign against the government of president of Ukraine Viktor Yanukovych took place on May 18, 2013. The event was initially prepared by the country's political opposition parties and number of civil movements as a culmination point to depose the president of Ukraine. Since then the protest in Kyiv however transformed into a preliminary final, while the new provisional final date was postponed to August 24, 2013, the Independence Day.

The Kyiv protest grew into a mass national scandal between a number of journalists and the parliamentary opposition deputies who tried to prove that authorities provoked disorder in the capital using armored military vehicles and sports athletes and the country's ruling party that denied any allegations and blaming everything on the opposition.

The marches were estimated to have 20,000 to 30,000 participants.

Preparations
The Kyiv events of May 18, the Europe Day in Ukraine, should have been a conclusion of the ongoing national campaign "Rise up, Ukraine!" that started on March 14, 2013. During the demonstrations the parliamentary opposition was supposed to announce the joint candidate to the 2015 presidential elections.

On May 16, 2013 the Kyiv City State Administration approved to hold both rallies, one led by the Party of Regions as "Into Europe without fascism" and another led by a coalition of opposition parliamentary parties as part of "Rise up, Ukraine!" campaign. As the start of the event drew close the members of parliamentary opposition were complaining that the authorities were impeding arrival of the event willing participants that were coming to Kyiv.

Along with the main political demonstrations that day in Kyiv were scheduled a lot of other public events. For example, the Social-Patriotic Assembly of Slavs planned to conduct a march "Ukraine - above all else" before noon, the Kyiv City State Administration authorities planned the opening of the European Village with participation of the Ambassador of the European Union Jan Tombiński and Minister of Foreign Affairs Leonid Kozhara. Also that day were supposed to take place Ice Cream Festival, cycling and motor trials with participation of sports vehicles, the International football festival "Great Ball" and many more.

"Rise up, Ukraine!" route
The demonstration "Rise up, Ukraine!" was scheduled to take place from 10:00 in the morning to 19:00 in the evening starting at the European Square. The Kyiv City Administration managed to find agreement with the All-Ukrainian Union Fatherland to leave the European Square by 12:15 in the afternoon and asked the Party of Regions not to start any events at the same square before 13:00.

"A group of athletic men in tracksuits" assaulted attendees of the "Rise up, Ukraine!" march and journalists.

"In Europe without fascism" route
The demonstration of Party of Regions which the party had called "anti-fascist demonstration" was planned to take place from 9:00 to 15:00 o'clock starting at the Memorial Complex "Museum of the Great Patriotic War 1941-1945" and finishing at the European Square. Participants of the rally ‘To Europe Without Fascists’ received compensation from Party of Regions "for the bus and daily expenses".

Earlier that spring more "Joining Europe without Fascists!" marches and "gathering" under the auspices of the Party of Regions were held. The 18 May 2013 march was meant as "final anti-fascist rally" of a "nationwide four-day meeting". According to press reports public employees had been ordered to attend the marches and gatherings.

The Jewish organisations Congress of the National Communities of Ukraine and the Association of Jewish Organizations and Communities have spoken out against the "Joining Europe without Fascists!" marches; calling them "aimed primarily to discredit the political opposition".

Demonstrations and rallies
Both rallies started to gather at the European Square on 18 May 2013 at 11:30. The rally of opposition eventually was supposed to march onto the Sofia Square (Sofiiska Ploshcha).

Highlights
Military vehicle blocked 
Participation of hostile civilians (athletes) in cooperation with militsiya
Passive actions from militsiya on demands of demonstrators to stop violence, allowing a civil disorder

Legacy
The term Titushky (unofficial pro-government mercenaries), much used during the 2013-2014 Euromaidan, derived from an attack by Vadym Titushko on Channel Five journalists in Kyiv on 18 May 2013.

See also
Ukraine without Kuchma
Orange Revolution
Euromaidan
 List of protests in the 21st century

References

External links

Photos from both the demonstrations. Ministry of Interior website. May 18, 2013

2010s in Kyiv
Social movements in Ukraine
Protests in Ukraine
Politics of Ukraine
2013 in Ukraine
Political scandals in Ukraine
2013 protests
Ukrainian democracy movements
Riots and civil disorder in Ukraine
Viktor Yanukovych
Klitschko brothers